Takehisa Yaegashi (born 1943) is a retired engineer for Toyota Motor Corporation. He led the team that developed the Prius and, though retired, still works as a consultant for Toyota. He is known as "Mr. Hybrid."

References
Your World Today broadcast transcript, CNN, April 24, 2006 (URL last accessed November 2, 2006).
Dawson, Chester, "Takehisa Yaegashi: Proud Papa Of The Prius", BusinessWeek, June 20, 2005 (URL last accessed November 2, 2006).
Fairley, Peter, "Hybrids' Rising Sun", Technology Review, April 1, 2004 (URL last accessed November 2, 2006).

Japanese automotive engineers
Toyota people
1943 births
Living people